Rondebosch Fountain is an ornamental Victorian drinking trough for horses, standing on a traffic island on the intersection between Belmont Road and Main Road in the centre of Rondebosch in Cape Town, South Africa. It was declared a National Monument on 10 April 1964.

Originally known as the Moodie Fountain, the fountain was made of cast iron in 1891 and consisted of a circular drinking trough supported on horses' legs, with a central post topped with a hexagonal lantern. Four decorated brackets may have originally suspended cups for people to drink from the spouting water, while horses drank from the trough, and dogs from smaller basins at ground level.

It was cast by Walter Macfarlane & Co. at the Saracen Foundry in Glasgow, Scotland, and presented to the community by George Pigot Moodie in 1891. The lantern was South Africa's first electric streetlight and was first turned on on 25 April 1892, initially powered by Moodie's private power plant until a municipal power plant on the Liesbeek River was completed.

The original cast iron fountain was destroyed in August 2015 when a speeding car smashed into it, and some of the pieces were stolen. The fountain was rebuilt in aluminium by local company Heritage Castings. The rebuilt fountain was installed on the 24 September 2020.

Gallery

Similar fountains
The Fountain was listed as Water Trough number 27 in the Macfarlane's Castings Catalogue, Sixth edition, vol. 2.

Two similar fountains manufactured at Saracen Foundry to the same design exist in South Africa: one in the neighbouring suburb of Rosebank, but without the horses' legs, and one in Cradock in the Eastern Cape, now without the original hexagonal lantern. A cast iron fountain with a similar but simpler design stands in Jubilee Square, Simon's Town.
Other fountains to the same design include the Adye Douglas Water Trough in Australia, the Racedo Fountain in Argentina on Boulevard Racedo in front of the railway station in Paraná, Entre Ríos, and the Coronation Fountain in Loanhead, Scotland, dismantled in 1933.

References

Rondebosch
Fountains in South Africa